Pentagon City station is an underground Washington Metro station in the Pentagon City neighborhood of Arlington, Virginia, United States. It serves the Blue and Yellow Lines.

History
The station was opened on July 1, 1977, along with 16 other stations as part of the opening of the  – segment. 

On April 17, 2016, the Metroway bus rapid transit system was extended to Pentagon City, with the station becoming the northern terminus.

In February 2021, the Arlington County Board awarded a $6.5 million construction contract to add a second surface elevator to the station, with expected completion in spring 2023.

Station layout
Pentagon City station has two underground side platforms serving two tracks. The station has four entrances from the mezzanine level, which runs under Hayes Street: entrances from the east and west sides of Hayes Street via escalator, a direct entrance from the Fashion Centre at Pentagon City, and an entrance from the northeast corner of the 12th and Hayes Street intersection. The pedestrian tunnel for the latter entrance was built in 1984 but did not open to the public until 2018. Additionally, a provision exists at the station's south end for a future second mezzanine, with knock-out panels visible above the tracks on the station's south wall.

References

External links

 12th Street west entrance from Google Maps Street View
 12th Street east entrance from Google Maps Street View

Stations on the Blue Line (Washington Metro)
Transportation in Arlington County, Virginia
Washington Metro stations in Virginia
Stations on the Yellow Line (Washington Metro)
Railway stations in the United States opened in 1977
1977 establishments in Virginia
Railway stations located underground in Virginia
Metroway
Transport infrastructure completed in 2016
2016 establishments in Virginia